Anbar Tappeh may refer to:
 Anbar Tappeh, Alborz
 Anbar Tappeh, Golestan